The 2013 Alliance Truck Parts 250 was the 13th stock car race of the 2013 NASCAR Nationwide Series and the 22nd iteration of the event. The race was held on Saturday, June 15, 2013, in Brooklyn, Michigan at Michigan International Speedway, a  D-shaped oval. The race took the scheduled 125 laps to complete. At race's end, Regan Smith, driving for JR Motorsports, would pull away in the closing laps of the race to win his third career NASCAR Nationwide Series win and his second and final win of the season. To fill out the podium, Kyle Larson of Turner Scott Motorsports and Paul Menard of Richard Childress Racing would finish second and third, respectively.

Background 

The race was held at Michigan International Speedway, a two-mile (3.2 km) moderate-banked D-shaped speedway located in Brooklyn, Michigan. The track is used primarily for NASCAR events. It is known as a "sister track" to Texas World Speedway as MIS's oval design was a direct basis of TWS, with moderate modifications to the banking in the corners, and was used as the basis of Auto Club Speedway. The track is owned by International Speedway Corporation. Michigan International Speedway is recognized as one of motorsports' premier facilities because of its wide racing surface and high banking (by open-wheel standards; the 18-degree banking is modest by stock car standards).

Entry list

Practice 
The only practice session was held on Friday, June 14, at 1:10 PM EST, and would last for two hours and 15 minutes.

Qualifying 
Qualifying was held on Saturday, June 15, at 10:35 AM EST. Each driver would have two laps to set a fastest time; the fastest of the two would count as their official qualifying lap.

No drivers would fail to qualify.

Full qualifying results

Race results

References 

Alliance Truck Parts 250
NASCAR races at Michigan International Speedway
Alliance Truck Parts 250
Alliance Truck Parts 250